Farm City: The Education of an Urban Farmer is a 2009 memoir by Novella Carpenter. The book describes her extensive garden in Ghost Town, a run down neighborhood a mile from downtown Oakland, California. Farm City was listed by some reviewers as one of the top books of 2009.

References

Urban agriculture
Books about the San Francisco Bay Area
Culture of Oakland, California